Larbert railway station is a railway station serving Larbert near Falkirk, Scotland.

History 
The station was built by the Scottish Central Railway, opening on 1 March 1848. Both lines had triangular junctions with the main line, giving access from the south as well as from Larbert. The Denny branch was also linked into the Kilsyth and Bonnybridge Railway from 1882, providing an alternative route to Glasgow via Kirkintilloch and to  via the Kelvin Valley Railway. The station also served as the interchange for the South Alloa branch of the SCR from its opening in 1853, which was subsequently linked to the Alloa Railway via  and a swingbridge over the River Forth from 1885.

The Polmont line remains in use today by services to and from Edinburgh, but the Denny line was closed to passengers by the London and North Eastern Railway on 28 July 1930, with the Kilsyth branch following suit on 1 February 1935. Freight traffic to Denny and the power station at Bonnybridge continued until 1971.
 
The station building features a plaque commemorating the Quintinshill rail disaster in 1915, as it was from here that the ill-fated troop train involved in the accident originated.

Location 
The station comprises two platforms - one serving northbound services via Stirling, and southbound services via Edinburgh and Glasgow - linked by a covered walkway. Goods loops exist immediately to the north of the station - which today are mainly used by freight services, to allow faster passenger trains to overtake.

The station was modernised in the late 1970s with the two major platforms extended in 2004 along with additional security and information signage. With the growth in population of Larbert, the numbers of commuters and passengers using the station has risen in recent years. In common with almost all other stations in Scotland, Larbert station is operated by ScotRail who also provide the train services.

In 2007, Larbert station underwent upgrades costing £850,000 with CCTV installed, new bicycle lockers, a footway and cycleways and a bus turning circle. From 2018 the lines through the station are due to be electrified – trains on the Croy Line and the Edinburgh to Dunblane Line will then be operated by new EMUs.

Services 
It is located on the Edinburgh to Dunblane and Croy Lines and as such, has regular links to both Glasgow and Edinburgh. Most long-distance services to Perth,  and  pass through without stopping, though a limited number do call at peak periods (morning southbound and evening northbound). On Sundays, both main routes (Edinburgh – Dunblane and Glasgow – Alloa) run hourly.

References

Notes

Sources

External links

Railway stations in Falkirk (council area)
Former Caledonian Railway stations
Railway stations in Great Britain opened in 1848
Railway stations served by ScotRail
Larbert